An enemy of the state is a person accused of certain crimes against the state such as treason, among other things. Describing individuals in this way is sometimes a manifestation of political repression. For example, a government may purport to maintain national security by describing social or political dissidents as "enemies of the state". In other cases, the individual in question may have in fact endangered the country and its population.

Examples

Political
 In ancient Rome, some parties could be named an enemy of the state through specific public actions resulting in a formally recognized state of war. The Latin term proscription was used for official condemnation of enemies of the state.
 The term "enemy of the people" in the Soviet Union during the period of Stalinism.
 Communists were considered as enemies of the state in Indonesia since 1965. Displaying communist symbols or attempting to propagate the ideology is considered an act of high treason and terrorism punishable by up to 20 years of imprisonment. 
 Jews, Romani people, Jehovah's Witnesses, homosexuals, disabled, communists, social democrats and trade unionists were considered "enemies of the state" in Nazi Germany.
 Carlos Lamarca, a Brazilian Army Captain who deserted to become the leader of a left-wing guerrilla against the military dictatorship; Lamarca was the only man in the history of Brazil to receive the status of traitor, being considered an "enemy of the state".
 Leaker of classified U.S. military documents and diplomatic cables Chelsea Manning was charged with "aiding the enemy" (identified as al-Qaeda).
 Edward Snowden, the American computer specialist who leaked details of top-secret United States and British government mass surveillance programs to the press, has been discussed by opinion writers as being persecuted as an enemy of the state.
 Human rights defenders working on behalf of communities affected by large-scale development projects are increasingly branded as enemies of the state.
 Clive Palmer, an Australian mining magnate, was labelled as such by Mark McGowan, the Premier of Western Australia, when Palmer sued the Western Australian government for not allowing him free entry into the state during the COVID-19 pandemic lockdowns.

Biography
 Justin Raimondo's biography of Murray Rothbard, An Enemy of the State: The Life of Murray N. Rothbard.
 Bill Lueders' biography of Erwin Knoll, An Enemy of the State: The Life of Erwin Knoll.

Fictional
 The fictional character Peter LaNague in the novel An Enemy of the State (The LaNague Federation, Book 1) by F. Paul Wilson.
 The fictional character Emmanuel Goldstein in the novel Nineteen Eighty-Four by George Orwell.
 In Resident Evil: Damnation, special agent Leon S. Kennedy is accused of being an enemy of the state by President of the Eastern Slav Republic Svetlana Belikova who orders her guards to kill him right after she briefly spars in one-on-one combat with him.
 The six main characters in Final Fantasy XIII are branded as enemies of the state following the destruction of Cocoon; the main events of the game revolve around them trying to survive and hopefully clear their names.
 Tali'Zorah is accused of treason during her personal quest in Mass Effect 2.
 In the NCIS: New Orleans episode "Breaking Brig", the team hunt down a suspect known as "Matt S. O'Feeney", which was an anagram for eneMy OF State. The suspect was a dangerous man wanted by NCIS and Interpol for illegal arms dealing and other criminal activities.

See also
 Enemy of the people
 Public enemy

References 

Political repression
Political repression in China
Political repression in Cuba
Political repression in North Korea
Political repression in the Soviet Union
Political repression in Vietnam